Camille Cerf (born 9 December 1994) is a French model and beauty pageant titleholder who was crowned Miss France 2015. She represented her country in Miss Universe 2014, where she placed in the top fifteen.

Early life
Camille Cerf grew up in Coulogne with her parents and twin sister Mathilde.

At age 15, she entered the Elite Model Look contest by Elite Model Management and got a contract with this modeling agency after being one of the finalists.

She received a Bachelor's degree from a French business school in 2017.

She started to raise cancer awareness after her father died of cancer in September 2014. She told Metronews that she would like to create an association that helps people suffering from cancer to live a better life.

Pageantry

Miss France 2015
Miss Nord-Pas-de-Calais 2014 title winner, Camille was crowned Miss France 2015 at the grand finale of the 68th edition of Miss France beauty pageant at the Zenith in Orléans on Grand coronation night of 6 December 2014. This is the first time that Miss France is from Nord-Pas-de-Calais.

Miss Universe 2014
In January 2015, Camille represented France at the Miss Universe 2014 contest in Doral, Miami, Florida, United States, and she placed in the Top 15. She was appointed as Miss Universe France 2014 since the election was held on 25 January 2015, after the end of Miss France 2014's reign who participated to Miss World 2014 in December 2014.

Personal life
In 2014, when he was elected, Camille Cerf was in a relationship with Maxime Bera. From 2018 to the end of December 2020, she is in a relationship with physiotherapist Cyrille Roty. She is now in a relationship with Théo Fleury.

References

External links

1994 births
Living people
People from Calais
French beauty pageant winners
French female models
Miss France winners
Miss Universe 2014 contestants
French twins